Arenibacter certesii is a heterotrophic and aerobic bacterium from the genus of Arenibacter which has been isolated from the green alga Ulva fenestrata from the Sea of Japan.

References

External links
Type strain of Arenibacter certesii at BacDive -  the Bacterial Diversity Metadatabase	

Flavobacteria
Bacteria described in 2004